The wildlife of Armenia includes, in addition to plants, wild boars, porcupines, various lizards, snakes and numerous species of birds. Endangered species living in Armenia are the Caucasian bear, Caucasian bearded goat, the Armenian mouflon (sheep) and the leopard.

Fauna

Fauna in Armenia is diverse given the country's relatively small size, owing to the varied habitats created by the area's mountainous terrain. Armenia is an important area for migratory animals, about 350 different bird species were recorded in the country. Many of the world's domesticated animals originated in or near Armenia, and the mouflon, the ancestor of domesticated sheep, is present there. Research suggests that about a quarter of the animal species in Armenia are internationally endangered. The mouflon is suffering a great population decline due to poaching and habitat loss, and the Sevan trout, which once made up thirty percent of the fish in Lake Sevan, have virtually disappeared.

Southern and south-western Armenia remains the last stronghold of the Persian leopard in the Caucasus, in part due to the region being connected with the leopard population in Iran. The total population in Armenia is thought to number 10 to 20 individuals, including adults, sub-adults and cubs.

Common

 Armenian gull
 Armenian rock lizard
 Eurasian brown bear
 Caucasian bear
 Common spoonbill
 Eastern imperial eagle
 Eumeces schneiderii
 European otter
 Greek tortoise
 Karabakh horse
 Long-eared hedgehog
 Marbled polecat
 Natterer's bat
 Persian leopard
 Sevan khramulya
 Sevan trout
 Squacco heron
 Steppe eagle
 Syrian brown bear
 Montivipera raddei
 Wild goat
 Caucasian badger
 Red deer
 Beech marten

Flora

 Acer campestre
 Apricot
 Armenian cucumber
 Downy birch
 Black poplar
 Elaeagnus angustifolia
 Eurasian smoketree
 European pear
 Common fig
 Hackberry
 Sycamore maple
 White mulberry
 Norway maple
 Armenian oak
 Pomegranate
 Populus alba
 Pyrus salicifolia
 Quince
 Sea-buckthorn
 Tatar maple
 Prunus avium
 White willow

See also
 List of birds of Armenia

References

Additional sources
 "Krasnaya kniga Armyanskoi SSR, zhivotnye". 1987. Yerevan, Hayastan.
 Kurkjian, R. (1999). Out of Stone. Armenia. Artsakh. Stone Garden Productions, Washington, DC.

External links
 List of freshwater fishes of Armenia
 Extinct Armenian animals
 Fauna in Armenia
 Armenia's amphibians and reptiles

Armenia
Biota of Armenia